Alastor anomalus is a species of wasp in the family Vespidae.

References

anomalus